Bridgette Anne Barry (March 1, 1957 – January 20, 2021) was an American biophysicist and biochemist. She was a professor and researcher of molecular biophysics and biochemistry in the Georgia Tech Chemistry and Biochemistry department from 2003 until her death. Her research focused on protein electron and oxygen evolution mechanisms.

Education 
Barry attended Oberlin College in Oberlin, Ohio and received a Bachelor of Arts in Chemistry with High Honors in 1978. She later received her Ph.D. in Chemistry at the University of California, Berkeley in December 1984.

Career 
Barry began her teaching career at the University of Minnesota in 1988 as a professor and later became a professor at the Georgia Institute of Technology in 2003.

Research 
Barry's lab focused on how the protein matrix facilitates biological catalysis by utilizing spectroscopic, biochemical, and structural techniques to describe the reaction coordinate. Some topics include photosynthetic water oxidation and solar energy conversion, biomimetic peptide models, and proton-coupled electron transfer and DNA synthesis.

Awards and honors 

Barry held the Graduate Opportunity Fellowship at the University of California (1982-1983), McKnight Postdoctoral Fellowship at Michigan State University (1985), Public Health Service Award at the National Institutes of Health (1985-1988), Faculty Summer Research Fellowship at the University of Minnesota (1989), fellowship at the American Association for the Advancement of Science (2009), and fellowship at the American Chemical Society (2010). 

She participated in the Bush Foundation Faculty Development Program (1992-1993) and received the Bush Sabbatical Award from the University of Minnesota in 1997. During that same year, Barry also received the Career Advancement Award from the National Science Foundation. She is a national honorary member of Iota Sigma Pi.

Selected works 
 Guo, Zhanjun; He, Jiayuan; Barry, Bridgette (2018).  "Calcium, conformational selection, and redox-active tyrosine YZ in the photosynthetic oxygen-evolving cluster". Proceedings of the National Academy of Sciences.
 Brahmachari, U.; Gonthier, J.; Sherrill, C; Barry, B. (2018). "Chloride Maintains a Protonated Internal Water Network in the Photosynthetic Oxygen Evolving Complex". ACS Publications.

References 

American biophysicists
Women biophysicists
American molecular biologists
Women molecular biologists
American women biochemists
20th-century American biologists
20th-century American chemists
20th-century American physicists
21st-century American biologists
21st-century American chemists
21st-century American physicists
American women physicists
Georgia Tech faculty
Oberlin College alumni
1957 births
2021 deaths
UC Berkeley College of Letters and Science alumni
American women academics
20th-century American women scientists
21st-century American women scientists